Events from the year 1984 in the United Kingdom. The year was dominated by the miners' strike.

Incumbents
 Monarch – Elizabeth II
 Prime Minister – Margaret Thatcher (Conservative)
 Parliament – 49th

Events

January
 January – General Motors ends production of the Vauxhall Chevette after nine years. 
 1 January – The Bornean Sultanate of Brunei gains full independence from the United Kingdom, having become a British protectorate in 1888.
 3 January – The FTSE 100 Index starts.
 6 January – The Society of Motor Manufacturers and Traders announces that a record of nearly 1.8million cars were sold in Britain last year. The best-selling car for the second year running was the Ford Escort with more than 174,000 sales.
 9 January – Sarah Tisdall, a 23-year-old Foreign Office clerk, is charged under the Official Secrets Act.
 13 January – Six people die when Britain is battered by hurricane-force winds.
 14 January – Six people die during a fire at the Maysfield Leisure Centre in Belfast.
 15 January – Left-wing MP Tony Benn wins the Labour Party's nomination for the Chesterfield by-election, eight months after losing his seat as Member of parliament (MP) for Bristol in the General Election.
 25 January – The government prohibits GCHQ staff from belonging to any trade union.

February
 1 February 
Japanese car maker Nissan signs an agreement with the British government to build a car factory in Britain. This landmark deal means that foreign cars will be built in Britain for the first time, with the factory set to open during 1986.
Chancellor of the Exchequer Nigel Lawson announces that after 13 years, the halfpenny will be demonetised and withdrawn from circulation.
 7–19 February – Great Britain and Northern Ireland compete at the Winter Olympics in Sarajevo, Yugoslavia, and win one gold medal.
 12 February – Austin Rover announces that the Triumph marque will be discontinued this summer after 63 years, as the Triumph Acclaim's successor will be sold as a Rover.
 14 February – Torvill and Dean win a gold medal for ice skating at the Winter Olympics.

March
 1 March – Labour MP Tony Benn is returned to parliament after winning the Chesterfield by-election, having lost his previous seat at the general election last year.
 2 March – Just five months after becoming Labour Party leader, Neil Kinnock's ambition of becoming Prime Minister at the next election (due to be held by June 1988) are given a boost when Labour come top of a MORI poll with 41% of the vote (compared to the 38% attained by the Conservatives). Just over six months ago, the Conservatives had a 16-point lead over Labour in the opinion polls. However, Kinnock is still faced with the task of overhauling a triple-digit Conservative majority.
 12 March – Miners' strike begins and pits the National Union of Mineworkers against Margaret Thatcher's Conservative government intent on free market reform of the nationalised industries, which includes plans for the closure of most of Britain's remaining coal pits.
 14 March – Sinn Féin's Gerry Adams and three others are seriously injured in a gun attack by the Ulster Volunteer Force (UVF).
 21 March – European Economic Community summit breaks down over disagreement over Britain's budget rebate with Margaret Thatcher threatening to veto any expansion of spending plans.
 23 March – Hilda Murrell, 78-year-old rose grower and anti-nuclear campaigner, is found dead near her home in Shropshire, five days after being reported missing. West Mercia Police launch a murder investigation.
 27 March – Starlight Express opens at Apollo Victoria Theatre in London.
 28 March – A greenfield site at Washington, near Sunderland, is confirmed as the location for the new Nissan car factory.
 31 March – Chatham Dockyard in Medway is closed after being used a shipbuilding yard for over 400 years since the reign of Henry VIII.

April
 2 April – Youth gangs run riot in Wolverhampton, looting from shops.
 4 April – Peace protesters evicted from the Greenham Common Women's Peace Camp.
 9 April – More than 100 pickets are arrested in violent clashes at the colliery at Creswell, Derbyshire, and the Babbington Colliery in Nottinghamshire. It is estimated that 46 out of 176 British coal mines are currently active as miners fight government plans to close 20 coal mines across Britain.
 12 April
 Arthur Scargill, the leader of the National Union of Mineworkers, rules out a national ballot of miners on whether to continue their strike, which has already lasted five weeks.
 Telecommunications Act 1984 provides for the privatisation of British Telecom.
 15 April – Comedian Tommy Cooper, 63, collapses and dies on stage from a heart attack during a live televised show, Live from Her Majesty's.
 17 April – WPC Yvonne Fletcher is shot and killed by a secluded gunman during a siege outside the Libyan Embassy in London in the event known as the 1984 Libyan Embassy Siege. 11 other people are also shot but survive.
 22 April – In the wake of WPC Yvonne Fletcher's death, Britain severs diplomatic relations with Libya and serves warning on its seven remaining Libyan diplomats to return to their homeland.
 25 April – Austin Rover launches its new Montego four-door saloon, which replaces the Austin Ambassador and Morris Ital, and is derived from the Maestro hatchback. A five-door estate version of the Montego is due later this year.
 27 April – 30 Libyan diplomats leave Britain.

May
 2 May – The Liverpool International Garden Festival opens in Liverpool.
 8 May – The Thames Barrier, designed to protect London from floods, is opened by The Queen.
 12 May – Liverpool F.C. secure a third consecutive league title and the 15th in the club's history, despite being held to a 0–0 draw away at Notts County.
 19 May – Everton win the FA Cup, their first major trophy for 14 years, with a 2–0 win over Watford in the final at Wembley Stadium. The goals are scored by Andy Gray and Graeme Sharp. Everton's last FA Cup triumph came in 1966, and they have now won the trophy four times.
 23 May – 16 people are killed in the Abbeystead disaster, caused by exploding methane gas.
 26 May – The football British Home Championship, which has been contested by the four home nations since 1884, witnesses its last game. Northern Ireland win the trophy.
 29 May – Fighting at Orgreave colliery between police and striking miners leaves 64 injured.
 30 May
 The Queen officially opens a new terminal at Birmingham International Airport. The terminal has been in use since the start of last month, replacing the original terminal that opened in 1939.
 Liverpool win the European Cup for the fourth time with a penalty shoot-out victory over AS Roma of Italy after a 1–1 draw in the final at Olympic Stadium in Rome. Liverpool, who have also won the Football League First Division and Football League Cup this season, are the first English club to win three major trophies in the same season.
 Arthur Scargill is arrested and charged with obstruction at Orgreave.

June
 1 June – Murder of Mark Tildesley: A 7-year-old boy from Wokingham in Berkshire disappears after visiting a local fairground and being abducted and killed by a paedophile group led by Sidney Cooke; only one named member of the gang is convicted of the crime (in 1992) and the victim's body will not be found (as of 2019).
 7 June – 120 people are arrested when fighting breaks out outside the Houses of Parliament during a mass lobby by striking miners.
 14 June – The European Parliament Election is held. The Tories lead the way with 45 MEPs, with Labour in second place with 32. The SDP–Liberal Alliance gains 18.5% of the vote but fails to elect a single MEP.
 15 June – A miner picketing a Yorkshire power station is killed by a lorry.
 18 June – Battle of Orgreave confrontation between picketing miners and police.
 19 June – Austin Rover launches the Rover 200 saloon, the replacement for the Triumph Acclaim which marks the end of the Triumph brand after 61 years. Like its predecessor, the new car is the result of a venture with Honda.
 20 June – The biggest school examination shake-up in over 10 years is announced with O-level and CSE examinations to be replaced by a new examination, the GCSE. The first GCSE courses will begin in September 1986 and will be completed in the summer of 1988.
 22 June – The inaugural Virgin Atlantic flight takes place.
 29 June – Control of London Transport is removed from the Greater London Council and transferred to London Regional Transport (reporting to the Secretary of State for Transport) under terms of the London Regional Transport Act 1984.
 30 June – Elton John plays the famous Night and Day Concert at Wembley Stadium.
 June – British unemployment is at a record high of around 3.26 million – though a higher percentage of the nation's workforce were unemployed during the Great Depression some 50 years ago.

July
 4 July – The government announces the abolition of dog licences.
 6 July 
David Jenkins consecrated as Bishop of Durham, despite strong objections from conservative Christians.
Murder of Isabel Schwarz, a psychiatric social worker, in South London.
 7 July – The 10th G7 summit held in London.
 9 July – A fire in the roof of York Minster, probably caused by an electrical storm, causes extensive damage which is expected to cost millions of pounds to repair.
 12 July – Robert Maxwell buys the Daily Mirror for £113.4 million.
 18 July – The general-interest magazine Tit-Bits closes after 104 years. 
 19 July
 A magnitude 5.4 earthquake with an epicentre in the Llŷn Peninsula of North Wales is felt throughout the United Kingdom.
 Neil Kinnock's hopes of becoming Prime Minister are given a boost by the latest MORI poll which puts Labour three points ahead of the Conservatives on 40%,
 26 July – Trade Union Act prohibits unions from striking without a ballot.
 28 July–12 August – Great Britain and Northern Ireland compete at the Olympics in Los Angeles, California, and win 5 gold, 11 silver and 21 bronze medals.

August
 2 August – A Surrey businessman wins a case in the European Court of Human Rights over illegal phone tapping by the police.
 11 August – Barefoot South African runner Zola Budd, controversially granted British citizenship earlier in the year, collides with Mary Decker in the 3000 meters final at the Olympics, neither finishing as medallists.
 24 August – Vauxhall unveils the Mk2 Astra which will go on sale in October.

September
 6 September – A MORI poll shows that the Conservatives now have a slim lead over Labour for the first time this year.
 7 September – An outbreak of food poisoning in two Yorkshire hospitals has so far claimed 22 lives in the space of two weeks.
 10 September – Geneticist Alec Jeffreys discovers DNA fingerprinting.
 11 September – Police arrest Malcolm Fairley at an address in Kentish Town, London, following a nationwide manhunt for the sex attacker known as The Fox.
 15–16 September – Bones believed to be those of St Edward the Martyr (King of England, 975–978) are enshrined in the Church of St. Edward the Martyr, Brookwood, Surrey.
 15 September – The Princess of Wales (Diana) gives birth to her second son.
 16 September – The one-day-old son of the Prince and Princess of Wales (Charles and Diana) is named as Henry Charles Albert David.
 24 September – Four pupils and their teacher die and a further six pupils are injured when a roll of steel from a lorry crushes their minibus near Stuart Bathurst RC High School in Wednesbury, West Midlands.
 26 September – The United Kingdom and the People's Republic of China sign the initial agreement to return Hong Kong to China in 1997.
 28 September – The High Court rules that the miner's strike is unlawful.

October
 1 October – David Jenkins, Bishop of Durham, launches an attack on Margaret Thatcher's social policies. The Durham area has been particularly hard hit by factory and mine closures since her election as Prime Minister five years ago.
 3 October – Plans to expand the Urban Enterprise Zone in Dudley, West Midlands, are approved; developers Don and Roy Richardson get the go-ahead to build a retail park and shopping mall on the main part of the site. The first tenants will move to the site next year and the development is expected in the next 18 months, with scope for further service sector developments in the future.
 5 October – Police in Essex make the largest cannabis seizure in British criminal history when a multimillion-pound stash of the drug is found on a schooner moored on the River Crouch near North Fambridge village.
9 October – Thomas the Tank Engine and Friends is first broadcast on ITV, becoming one of the most successful children's TV programmes of all time since Postman Pat on the BBC three years prior. 
 10 October – The High Court fines the NUM £200,000 and Arthur Scargill £1,000 for contempt of court.
 12 October – The Provisional Irish Republican Army attempts to assassinate the Conservative cabinet in the Brighton hotel bombing. Margaret Thatcher escapes unharmed, but MP Anthony Berry and four other people are killed, whilst Norman Tebbit is trapped among the rubble and his wife Margaret is seriously injured.
 13 October – Darts player John Lowe achieves the first televised nine dart finish.
 16 October
 There is good news for the state-owned car maker Austin Rover. On the day that a facelifted version of its top-selling Austin Metro, now available as a five-door as well as a three-door is launched, it is announced that sales for September have increased by 39% over the same period last year. The pre-facelift Metro was Britain's best selling car last month, while the mid-range Maestro (launched 19 months ago) was the second best seller ahead of its key rival the Ford Escort and the six-month-old Austin Montego was the fifth best seller ahead of the Ford Sierra.
 The Bill, the long-running police drama, airs for the first time on ITV. It debuted last year as a pilot show Wooden Top. When the last episode is shown in 2010 it will be the longest-running police procedural in British television history.
 18 October – Support for the Conservative government is reported to be improving after several months of dismal poll showings, with the latest MORI poll putting them nine points ahead of Labour on 44%.
 23 October – BBC News news presenter Michael Buerk gives powerful commentary of the famine in Ethiopia which has already claimed thousands of lives and reportedly has the potential to claim the lives of as many as 7 million more people. Numerous British charities including Oxfam and Save the Children begin collection work to aid the famine victims, who are mostly encamped near the town of Korem.
 31 October – Police and Criminal Evidence Act 1984 passed, codifying police powers in investigating suspects.

November
 5 November – 800 miners cease striking and return to work.
 15 November – The General Synod of the Church of England support the ordination of women as deacons, but not as full priests.
 19 November – The number of working miners increases to around 62,000 when nearly 3,000 striking miners return to work.
 20 November – British Telecom shares go on sale in the biggest share issue ever. Two million people (5% of the adult population) buy shares, almost doubling the number of share owners in Britain.
 22 November – Council of Civil Service Unions v Minister for the Civil Service, a leading case in UK constitutional law, is decided in the House of Lords, ruling that royal prerogative is subject to judicial review, although the government's action in preventing staff of GCHQ from joining a trade union can be justified on national security grounds.
 23 November – The Oxford Circus fire traps around 1,000 passengers on the London Underground but nobody is killed.
 25 November – 36 of Britain and Ireland's top pop musicians gather in a Notting Hill studio to form Band Aid and record the song "Do They Know It's Christmas" in order to raise money for famine relief in Ethiopia.
 28 November – The British Telecom share offer closes.
 30 November
 Tension in the miners' strike increases when two South Wales miners are charged with the murder of taxi driver David Wilkie, 35, who died when a concrete block was dropped on his car from a road bridge. The passenger in his car, who escaped with minor injuries, was a miner who had defied the strike and continued going to work.
 The UK and French governments announce their intention to seek private promoters for the construction of the Channel Tunnel in order to build and operate it without public funding. The tunnel, for which proposals were first made as far back as 1802, is expected to be open in the early-1990s. The tunnel would be formally opened in a ceremony in 1994 by Queen Elizabeth II and the President of France.

December
 3 December 
 British Telecom is privatised. 
 The Band Aid charity single is released. 
 10 December
 Richard Stone wins the Nobel Prize in Economics "for having made fundamental contributions to the development of systems of national accounts and hence greatly improved the basis for empirical economic analysis".
 César Milstein wins the Nobel Prize in Physiology or Medicine jointly with Niels Kaj Jerne and Georges J. F. Köhler "for theories concerning the specificity in development and control of the immune system and the discovery of the principle for production of monoclonal antibodies".
 11 December – Band Aid's "Do They Know It's Christmas?" goes to the top of the UK Singles Chart.
 12 December – Bucks Fizz, the highly successful pop group, are involved in a road accident near Newcastle upon Tyne when their tour bus crashes in icy road conditions after a concert. Bobby Gee, Cheryl Baker and Jay Aston escape with relatively minor injuries, but Mike Nolan is in a serious condition.
 14 December – Arthur Scargill, president of the NUM, is fined £250 and ordered to pay £750 for his involvement in the rioting at Orgreave coking plant on 29 May this year. He decides against appealing his convictions, despite his lawyers advising him to do so.
 16 December – Mikhail Gorbachev of the Soviet Union visits Britain.
 18 December – The government announces the privatisation of the Trustee Savings Bank.
 19 December
 The People's Republic of China and the United Kingdom sign the Sino-British Joint Declaration which will see the whole of the British Overseas Territory of Hong Kong returning to Chinese control in 13 years.
 Ted Hughes' appointment as Poet Laureate in succession to Sir John Betjeman is announced, Philip Larkin having turned down the post.
 21 December – The three-month-old son of The Prince and Princess of Wales is christened Henry Charles Albert David. (He is and always has been called "Harry").
 22 December – Band Aid's charity single is this year's Christmas number one.
 31 December – Rick Allen, drummer of Def Leppard, loses his left arm in a car accident on the A57 road at Snake Pass.

Undated
 Non-diocesan Bishop at Lambeth first appointed within the Church of England.
 Vauxhall have a successful year in the motor industry. It has reported that its market share has doubled since 1981 and the year ends on an even bigger high when its MK2 Astra range is elected European Car of the Year.
 Despite unemployment reaching a peak of nearly 3.3million this year (with the highest unemployment rate recorded since 1971 of 11.9% in February), inflation is still low at 5%.
 Youth unemployment (covering the 16–24 age range) stands at a record 1,200,000 – more than a third of the total unemployment count.

Publications
 Douglas Adams' novel So Long, and Thanks for All the Fish.
 J. G. Ballard's novel Empire of the Sun.
 Iain Banks's novel The Wasp Factory.
 Julian Barnes's novel Flaubert's Parrot.
 Anita Brookner's novel Hotel du Lac.
 Angela Carter's novel Nights at the Circus.
 Alasdair Gray's novel 1982, Janine
 David Lodge’s novel Small World: An Academic Romance.
 Mary Wesley's novel The Camomile Lawn.

Births
 15 January – Keiran Lee, British pornographic actor, director and producer
 17 January – Calvin Harris, Scottish electropop singer-songwriter, musician, DJ and record producer
 28 January 
Ben Clucas, English racing driver
Anne Panter, field hockey player
 12 February – Jennie McAlpine, actress 
 14 February – Stephanie Leonidas, actress
 27 February – Catriona Forrest, Scottish field hockey player
 28 March – Nikki Sanderson, actress
 8 April – Michelle Donelan, politician
 21 April – Bhavna Limbachia, actress 
 22 April
Michelle Ryan, actress
Phillip Magee, Northern Irish singer and The X Factor (British series 2) finalist
 4 May – Little Boots (Victoria Hesketh), electropop singer-songwriter, musician, DJ and record producer
 22 May – Clara Amfo, radio and television presenter
 10 June – Ryan Thomas, actor
 25 June – Amrita Hunjan, singer
 7 July – Adam Paul Harvey, actor
 8 July – TotalBiscuit, internet personality (d. 2018)
 12 July 
 Gareth Gates, singer
 Florence Hoath, actress
 18 July – Lee Barnard, footballer
 8 August – Owen Jones, journalist and political commentator
 19 August – Simon Bird, actor and comedian  
 5 September – Annabelle Wallis, actress
 15 September – Prince Harry, Duke of Sussex
 26 September – Keisha Buchanan, singer
 28 September 
 Simon Clarke, politician
 Helen Oyeyemi, novelist
 14 October – Alex Scott, English footballer and sports commentator
 16 October – Shayne Ward, singer
 18 October – Milo Yiannopoulos, alt-right commentator
 25 October – Adam MacKenzie, Scottish field hockey defender
 27 October – Kelly Osbourne, singer
 5 November – Nick Tandy, racing driver 
 8 November – Steven Webb, actor
 26 November – Jayde Adams, comedian
 30 November – Alan Hutton, Scottish footballer
 10 December – Mark Applegarth, English rugby player
 14 December – Chris Brunt, footballer
 21 December – Darren Potter, footballer
 28 December
Leroy Lita, footballer
Alex Lloyd, racing driver

Deaths
 1 January
 A. E. Clouston, test pilot and Royal Air Force Air Commodore (born 1909)
 Billy Hill, gangster (born 1911)
 Alexis Korner, musician (born 1928)
 Allen Wheeler, pilot and Royal Air Force Air Commodore (born 1903)
 3 January – Sir Morris Sugden, physical chemist (born 1919)
 4 January 
Sir Wilfred Burns, town planner (born 1923)
Sir Kenneth Thompson, politician and former Member of parliament for Liverpool Walton (born 1909)
 5 January – Thomas Bloomer, Bishop of Carlisle (born 1894)
 6 January – Ronald Lewin, military historian (born 1914)
 7 January – Beresford Egan, satirical draughtsman, painter, novelist and playwright (born 1905)
 8 January – Harry Selby, politician, Member of Parliament for Glasgow Govan
 9 January – Sir Frederick Gibberd, architect (born 1908)
 10 January
Lancelot Stephen Bosanquet, mathematician (born 1903)
Alasdair Clayre, author, broadcaster, singer-songwriter and academic (born 1935)
Binnie Hale, actress (born 1899)
Sir Ernest Albert Vasey, colonial politician and former actor (born 1901)
Christopher Woolner, senior army officer (born 1893)
 13 January
 Michael Shanks, journalist (born 1927)
 Tommy Younger, Scottish footballer (born 1930)
 20 January – Earl of Warwick, peer (born 1911)
 22 January – Noël Bowater, Lord Mayor of London (born 1892)
 4 February – Alan Buchanan, bishop (born 1905)
 5 February – Henry Somerset, 10th Duke of Beaufort (born 1900)
 10 March –  Maurice Macmillan, Conservative Party MP and son of former prime minister Harold Macmillan (born 1921)
 12 March – Arnold Ridley, playwright and actor (born 1896)
 31 March – Jack Howarth, actor (born 1896)
 5 April – Arthur Travers Harris, Air Officer Commanding-in-Chief of RAF Bomber Command during the Second World War (born 1892)
 15 April
 Tommy Cooper, comedian and magician (born 1921)
 William Empson, poet and literary critic (born 1906)
 Alexander Trocchi, writer (born 1925)
 23 April – Sir Roland Penrose, Surrealist painter and art collector (born 1900)
 4 May – Diana Dors, actress (born 1931)
 15 May – Mary Adams, television producer and social researcher (born 1898)
 19 May – Sir John Betjeman, writer and poet laureate (born 1906)
 28 May – Eric Morecambe, comedian (born 1926)
 21 June – Webster Booth, tenor (born 1902)
 7 July – Dame Flora Robson, actress (born 1902)
 27 July – James Mason, actor (born 1909)
 5 August – Richard Burton, Welsh-born actor (born 1925)
 14 August – J. B. Priestley, writer and broadcaster (born 1894)
 21 August – Bernard Youens, actor (born 1914)
 5 October – Leonard Rossiter, actor (born 1926)
 12 October – Anthony Berry, Member of Parliament (killed in the Brighton hotel bombing) (born 1925)
 14 October – Martin Ryle, radio astronomer, recipient of the Nobel Prize in Physics (born 1918)
 20 October – Paul Dirac, physicist and Nobel Prize laureate (born 1902)
 26 October – Michael Babington Smith, soldier, banker and sportsman (born 1901)
 5 November – Ivor Montagu, aristocrat, documentary film maker, table tennis player and Communist activist (born 1904)
 9 December – Ivor Moreton, singer and pianist (born 1908)
 15 December – Lennard Pearce, actor (born 1915)
 unknown – Jean Bain of Crathie, Aberdeenshire, last speaker of Deeside Gaelic (born Jean McDonald, 1890)

See also
 1984 in British music
 1984 in British television
 List of British films of 1984

References

 
Years of the 20th century in the United Kingdom
United Kingdom